Medford is a city in Taylor County, in north-central Wisconsin, United States. The population was 4,349 at the 2020 census. The city is located mostly within the boundaries of the Town of Medford. It is the county seat of Taylor County.

History
Medford is located on historic Ojibwe forest land acquired by the United States in the 1837 Treaty of St. Peters. The Wisconsin Central Railroad Company, controlled by Boston financier Gardner Colby, obtained the land grant and constructed the railroad in the 1870s. The railroad company and a local lumber milling company laid out the city of Medford in 1875 and sold lots for twenty-five dollars each. The railroad named the new settlement after Medford, Massachusetts, the hometown of a railroad official. Medford shipped over 1.5 million board feet of lumber by rail within a year of its establishment, and the area was soon clear cut for farming.

The Wisconsin Legislature organized Taylor County in 1875 and named Medford the county seat, leading to a dispute between the Wisconsin Central Railroad and the mill company over the location of the courthouse. The Taylor County Courthouse was ultimately constructed on land donated by the railroad company.

In the 1960s and 1970s, Medford hosted an annual Mink festival, celebrating the town's claim to be the "Mink capital of the world." Fur farms in the area make Taylor County a top mink producer in North America. During the COVID-19 pandemic, in 2020, thousands of mink died of the virus after having contracted it from human workers.

Geography 
Medford is located at  (45.137994, −90.345227).

Climate

Demographics

2020 census
As of the census of 2020, the population was 4,349. The racial makeup of the city was 92.3% White, 0.7% Asian, 0.7% Black or African American, 0.3% Native American, 2.1% from other races, and 4.0% from two or more races. Ethnically, the population was 4.6% Hispanic or Latino of any race.

2010 census
As of the census of 2010, there were 4,326 people, 1,982 households, and 1,094 families residing in the city. The racial makeup of the city was 97.0% White, 0.5% African American, 0.4% Native American, 0.6% Asian, 0.2% from other races, and 1.4% from two or more races. Hispanic or Latino of any race were 1.2% of the population.

There were 1,982 households, of which 26.0% had children under the age of 18 living with them, 40.6% were married couples living together, 10.0% had a female householder with no husband present, 4.5% had a male householder with no wife present, and 44.8% were non-families. 39.4% of all households were made up of individuals, and 19.6% had someone living alone who was 65 years of age or older. The average household size was 2.10 and the average family size was 2.79.

The median age in the city was 43 years. 22.2% of residents were under the age of 18; 7.7% were between the ages of 18 and 24; 22.6% were from 25 to 44; 25.7% were from 45 to 64; and 21.7% were 65 years of age or older. The gender makeup of the city was 47.5% male and 52.5% female.

2000 census
As of the census of 2000, there were 4,350 people. The population density was 1,243.9 people per square mile (479.9/km2). There were 2,034 housing units at an average density of 581.6 per square mile (224.4/km2). The racial makeup of the city was 98.69% White, 0.11% Black or African American, 0.18% Native American, 0.18% Asian, 0.02% from other races, and 0.80% from two or more races. 0.57% of the population were Hispanic or Latino of any race.

There were 1,947 households, out of which 27.2% had children under the age of 18 living with them, 45.9% were married couples living together, 9.0% had a female householder with no husband present, and 41.9% were non-families. 36.2% of all households were made up of individuals, and 16.8% had someone living alone who was 65 years of age or older. The average household size was 2.17 and the average family size was 2.86.

In the city, the population was spread out, with 23.2% under the age of 18, 8.6% from 18 to 24, 27.1% from 25 to 44, 19.2% from 45 to 64, and 21.9% who were 65 years of age or older. The median age was 39 years. For every 100 females, there were 91.0 males. For every 100 females age 18 and over, there were 86.6 males.

The median income for a household in the city was $35,278, and the median income for a family was $47,045. Males had a median income of $31,840 versus $23,955 for females. The per capita income for the city was $19,962. About 4.3% of families and 9.1% of the population were below the poverty line, including 12.9% of those under age 18 and 11.9% of those age 65 or over.

Government

Medford has a mayor-council form of government. The mayor is elected for a two-year term. Each of the four city districts is represented by an alderperson, with two elected to two-year terms in alternating years.

Recreation

Medford City Park 
An extensive redevelopment program for the park was initiated in 1979. Equipment and facilities include an outdoor swimming pool, with dressing area and wading pool, playground equipment, four park shelters, two restroom facilities, one tennis court, four volleyball courts, one basketball court, two softball fields, a concession stand, nine recreation vehicle camping facilities, a skatepark, the "River Walk" which parallels the Black River for the majority of its way through the city, and picnic and barbecue areas along the walkway. The  Medford millpond has been periodically dredged of sedimentation in an effort to improve fish habitat in the pond.

Grahl Park 
It has a Little League baseball field, basketball court, restroom facilities, park shelter, and playground equipment.

Pine Line Trail 
The southern trailhead of Wisconsin's Pine Line Trail, lies within Medford.

Curling Club 
The Medford Curling Club is located on the south side of the city. The Mixed National Championships were most recently held here in 2009. There are four sheets of ice, a changing room, and a warming area inside.

Golf courses 
The city has two golf courses, the Tee-Hi Golf Course and the Black River Golf Club.

Transportation

Major highways

Airport
KMDZ – Taylor County

Medford is served by the Taylor County Airport (KMDZ). It is located approximately three miles southeast of Medford. The airport handles approximately 7,000 operations per year, with roughly 93% general aviation and 7% air taxi. The airport has two asphalt runways; a 6,000-foot runway with approved GPS approaches (Runway 9–27) and a 4,435-foot crosswind runway, also with GPS approaches, (Runway 16–34).

Media

AM radio 
 WIGM AM 1490, (sports talk)

FM radio 
 WKEB FM 99.3, (Adult hits)

Newspaper 
 Star News

Education

Primary 
 Medford Area Elementary School, public school serving grades PK-4
 Medford Area Middle School, public school serving grades 5–8
 Holy Rosary Catholic School, Catholic school serving grades PK-6
 Immanuel Lutheran School, Lutheran school serving grades PK-8

Secondary 
 Medford Area Senior High School, public school serving grades 9–12

Post-secondary 
 Northcentral Technical College West Campus

Health care 
Aspirus Medford Hospital is a health care organization that operates a hospital, clinics, senior care facilities, and a skilled nursing care and rehabilitation facility in the Medford area. Featuring and extensive renovation done within the last 10 years, Memorial Health Center has been promoted to feature an Aspirus Heart and Vascular Institute.

Notable people 

 Michelle Curran, United States Air Force officer and pilot
 Jeane Dixon, psychic, prophet and astrologer
 John Gamper, Wisconsin politician
 Levi Withee Gibson, Wisconsin politician
 Ryan Goessl, international choral conductor and soloist
 Anthony J. Opachen, Wisconsin politician
 John K. Parish, Wisconsin politician and jurist
 Jack Perkins, actor
 Erny Pinckert, football player
 Zachary Rhyner, Air Force Cross recipient
 Steve Russ, Denver Broncos linebacker
 Joe "Pep" Simek, co-founder of Tombstone Pizza and founder of Pep's Pizza
 Scott Suder, Wisconsin politician
 Clinton Textor, Wisconsin politician
 Elias L. Urquhart, Wisconsin politician

Images

References

External links

City of Medford
Medford Chamber of Commerce
 Medford, Wis., county seat of Taylor County before the great fire May 28, 1885 Library of Congress, map collection
 Sanborn fire insurance maps: 1894 1901 1913

Cities in Wisconsin
Cities in Taylor County, Wisconsin
County seats in Wisconsin